The Gwangju Institute of Science and Technology (GIST) is a research-oriented university focused on science and technology that is located in Gwangju, South Korea. GIST is a member of the research-oriented universities group consisting of GIST-KAIST-UNIST-POSTECH-DGIST.

History
The Gwangju Institute of Science and Technology (GIST) was established by the South Korean government in 1993 as a research-oriented graduate school to train highly skilled scientists and researchers, to create a strong research base for further development of advanced science and technology, and to promote collaborative foreign and domestic research programs within industry and academia. According to a 2012 news article in the Korea JoongAng Daily, "All classes are taught in English, and master’s and doctoral thesis are all written in English. Doctoral students only receive their degrees if they have published more than one work as the first author in scientific journals, encouraging them to be research leaders. And in 2001, GIST became the first Korean university to introduce a thesis quality certification [program], gaining attention from the science field and the media."

Then in 2010, GIST College was established at GIST to offer Korea's first liberal arts oriented science curriculum for undergraduate students.  According to GIST College Professor Kyung-Deok Roh, "GIST College is the only university that pursues and practices the philosophy of liberal arts education in Korea. ... However, GIST College has unique traits that separate it from conventional liberal arts colleges. It is because GIST first started out as a research-oriented graduate school, and as such its undergraduate education can utilize and benefit from the knowledge, infrastructure, and expertise that the research institution already possesses. In other words, GIST College, while upholding liberal arts as the core of its undergraduate education, can also work closely with the graduate school for deeper-level education and research. This is a feature that makes GIST College all the more special."

Rankings
In the 2016/2017 QS World University Rankings® Result tables, GIST was ranked number 2 in the world in the category of citations per faculty. In the Times Higher Education World University Rankings 2014-2015, GIST was ranked 96th in the world in the category of Engineering & Technology.

Special Rankings

Timeline

Departments

GIST College (bachelor's programs)
Division of Liberal Arts and Sciences (freshmen)
Majors (sophomores, juniors and seniors)
Physics Concentration
Chemistry Concentration
Life Science Concentration
Engineering and Applied Science Concentrations
Electrical Engineering and Computer Science Concentration
Mechanical Engineering Concentration
Materials Science and Engineering Concentration
Earth Sciences and Environmental Engineering Concentration

Graduate Schools (master's and doctoral programs)

School of Electrical Engineering and Computer Science
School of Mechanical Engineering
School of Materials Science and Engineering
School of Earth Sciences and Environmental Engineering
School of Life Sciences
School of Physics and Chemistry
Department of Physics and Photon Science 
Department of Chemistry
Department of Nanobio Materials and Electronics
Department of Biomedical Science and Engineering

See also
List of national universities in South Korea
List of universities and colleges in South Korea
Education in Korea

References

External links 
 Graduate Official Website, in English
 Undergraduate Official Website, in Korean and English 

Universities and colleges in Gwangju
Gwangju Institute of Science and Technology
Educational institutions established in 1993
1993 establishments in South Korea
National universities and colleges in South Korea